Jack Van Antwerp  is an American photography and journalism professional, He is noted as The Wall Street Journal's first global Director of Photography who migrated The Journal from a mostly text-only print and online newspaper to a visual publication.

Education 
Raised in Cleveland, Van Antwerp was educated at the Hawken School, Solon High School, and Rochester Institute of Technology. Graduating in 1986 with a BA in Photojournalism & Documentary Photography, Van Antwerp spent the next ten years working between New York and Cleveland as a freelance photographer while also serving as Cleveland Orchestra's staff photographer.

Career 
Moving to New York full-time, Van Antwerp joined CNN in 2000 where he worked with David Turnley as his field producer during the Invasion of Iraq. Upon returning to the states, Van Antwerp joined The New York Times as a staff reporter and photo editor, while also contributing to Play Magazine. Near the end of his time at NYTimes, Van Antwerp began contributing to The Wall Street Journal. Soon afterwards he was hired as the magazine's first global Director of Photography.

During his tenure as Director of Photography, Van Antwerp oversaw WSJ's expanded  the use of images to boost traffic, curated the magazine's year-ending Best of Photography video series, established the Photo Journal blog, unveiled behind-the-scenes footage at magazine to the general public, and increased payment to and contributions from the magazines fleet of freelance photographers.

Van Antwerp stepped down from his position at WSJ in 2014.

References 

1963 births
American photojournalists
Photography in Iraq
Living people
Rochester Institute of Technology alumni
American photographers
Photographers from Ohio